Women's Downhill World Cup 1987/1988

Final point standings

In Women's Downhill World Cup 1987/88 all results count. Michela Figini won her third Downhill World Cup. Swiss athletes were able to win all races.

References
 fis-ski.com

External links
 

World Cup
FIS Alpine Ski World Cup women's downhill discipline titles